Olkhovy is a rural locality (a settlement) in Unechsky District, Bryansk Oblast, Russia. The population was 3 as of 2010. There is 1 street.

Geography 
Olkhovy is located 12 km northwest of Unecha (the district's administrative centre) by road. Ivanov is the nearest rural locality.

References 

Rural localities in Unechsky District